Priolepis cincta, commonly known as the girdled goby, is a species of goby fish described by Regan in 1908.

Distribution
Its distributional range extends from the Red Sea to Tonga, then from Japan to the Great Barrier Reef. It can be found in Brackish water and Salt water, with a depth range of 1 – 70 metres (3 ft - 229 ft), although it is usually seen at depths of 1 – 30 metres (3 ft - 98 ft).

Behaviour
The fish is a benthic spawner. They tend to hide in caves and crevices, and can also be found in corals. It is a Monogamous fish and are an average length of 7 centimetres. The species is used in aquarium commercial use by humans.

Etymology
The name Priolepis is combined from two words from the Greek Language: prio is translated as "to saw" while lepis means "scale". cincta derives from the Latin word cinctum which can translate to either a girdle or bird, which is in reference to its colour pattern.

References 

cincta
Fish described in 1908
Fish of Japan
Fish of Australia
Fish of Thailand